Dr. Dolittle: Tail to the Chief (also known as Dr. Dolittle 4) is a 2008 American comedy film directed by Craig Shapiro and starring Kyla Pratt and Norm Macdonald. It is the fourth film in the Dr. Dolittle series. 

Like its predecessor, Dr. Dolittle 3 in 2006, it was released direct to DVD as well, on March 4, 2008. It is also the second film in the series not to feature Eddie Murphy as Doctor Dolittle, or Raven-Symoné as Charisse Dolittle, although Doctor Dolittle was mentioned in the film. The role of Lisa Dolittle, originally played by Kristen Wilson, is now played by Karen Holness.

Plot
Maya Dolittle is the girl who can talk to animals; so can her older sister Charisse Dolittle and father John Dolittle. John is away on animal expeditions while Charisse is in college. When the President asks for him to help with the Presidential dog and save an African forest, Maya takes her father's place. The dog Daisy has a very hot temper but after a lot of trouble, they begin to get along.

At a dinner with the prince and princess of the kingdom that the forest is located in, things are going well until they suddenly take a turn for the worse. With the help of animals, Maya finds out Chief Dorian was sabotaging the prince to shut down the forest and make millions. He is arrested and the forest is saved.

Cast
 Kyla Pratt as Maya Dolittle
 Peter Coyote as President Sterling
 Niall Matter as Cole Fletcher
 Elise Gatien as Courtney Sterling
 Malcolm Stewart as Chief Dorian
 Christine Chatelain as Selma Dixon
 Karen Holness as Lisa Dolittle

Voice cast
 Norm Macdonald as Lucky the Dog (uncredited)
 Jennifer Coolidge as Daisy
 Maggie Marson as Rabbit
 Benjamin Diskin as Anteater
 Greg Ellis as Wallaby
 Richard Kind as Groundhog
 Nolan North as Parrot
 Philip Proctor as Drunk Monkey
 Diana Yanez as Chinchilla

Production
The film's visual effects were supervised by the former head of Industrial Light & Magic's animation department, Wes Takahashi.
The estimated budget for this film is about $6,000,000.

Release
Dr. Dolittle: Tail to the Chief was released on DVD on March 4, 2008. It placed 15th for copies sold that week and was priced for $26.98.

Reception

Critical response
Film critic Kevin Carr gave the film a two and a half stars out of 5. Common Sense Media awarded it with three out of five stars. Sloan Freer of Radio Times gave it 2 out of 5 and called it "a sporadically amusing mix of gunge-heavy slapstick, mild adolescent angst and the usual simplistic life lessons".

References

External links
 

20th Century Fox direct-to-video films
2000s American films
2000s Canadian films
2000s English-language films
2008 comedy films
2000s fantasy comedy films
2008 films
American children's comedy films
American fantasy comedy films
Canadian children's comedy films
Davis Entertainment films
Direct-to-video fantasy films
Direct-to-video sequel films
Doctor Dolittle films
Film spin-offs
Films directed by Craig Shapiro
Films produced by John Davis
Films with screenplays by Matt Lieberman